The Emma Abbott Memorial Chapel is a late Victorian church located at 52 Cooper St., Charleston, South Carolina. On October 4, 1890, the Citadel Square Baptist Church bought a parcel at the northwest corner of Cooper and America Streets for the construction of a mission church serving the Eastside. The land was marshy and had to be filled at a cost of $1500. In January 1891, Citadel Square Baptist Church learned that it had been named as one of several beneficiaries of the estate of Emma Abbott, a popular opera singer. She had attended church at Citadel Square Baptist Church during trips to Charleston in 1880, 1886, and February 1888.

Abbott left the church $5,000, but because of New York probate laws, the gift could not be released until January 1892. In the meantime, the church began foundation work for the new church. The church hired Richmond, Virginia architect S.H. Foulk to design their new mission. The work was performed by John Murphy for $4,000; he finished the work in December 1892. The cost of the building had been higher than expected, and the steeple was not built. A two-story entrance tower appears to have been a later addition.

The church was designed in the Romanesque Revival style and has broad gables with shingles, narrow weatherboard siding, and large round-topped openings. The interior is executed largely in wood.

Since 1977, the church has been occupied by the Mt. Sinai Holiness Church of Deliverance.

References

Churches in Charleston, South Carolina